A riot at the Agricultural Penitentiary of Monte Cristo (Portuguese: Penitenciária Agrícola de Monte Cristo) occurred on 16 October 2016 in Boa Vista, Roraima, Brazil. 

Local media, citing police, said that at least 25 inmates died during the riot, with seven of them beheaded and six were burned to death.

Events
According to the Roraima state secretary of justice, the riot began on Sunday 16 October 2016, during visiting hours and an estimated 100 relatives of inmates were taken hostage for a brief time before being freed by police.

The riot was caused by a clash between two rival gangs.  The riot was one of several that occurred in Brazilian prisons during 2016.

See also
2017 Brazil prison riots

References

2016 crimes in Brazil
Prison uprisings in Brazil
Boa Vista, Roraima
2016 riots
October 2016 crimes in South America
Massacres in Brazil
Massacres in 2016
Organized crime conflicts in Brazil